EGS-zs8-1 is a high-redshift Lyman-break galaxy found at the northern constellation of Boötes.  In May 2015, EGS-zs8-1 had the highest spectroscopic redshift of any known galaxy, meaning EGS-zs8-1 was the most distant and the oldest galaxy observed. In July 2015, EGS-zs8-1 was surpassed by EGSY8p7 (EGSY-2008532660).

Description

The redshift of EGS-zs8-1 was measured at z = 7.73, corresponding to a light travel distance of about 13.040 billion light years from Earth, and age of 13.04 billion years. The galaxy shows a high rate of star formation, so it releases its peak radiation at the vacuum ultraviolet part of the electromagnetic spectrum, near the  Lyman-alpha emission line due to the intense radiation from newly formed blue stars, hence it is classified as a Lyman-break galaxy; high-redshift starburst galaxies emitting the Lyman-alpha emission line. Because of the cosmological redshift effect caused by the metric expansion of space, the peak light from the galaxy has become redshifted and has moved into the infrared part of the electromagnetic spectrum. The galaxy has a comoving distance (light travel distance multiplied by the Hubble constant, caused by the metric expansion of space) of about 30 billion light years from Earth.

EGS-zs8-1 was born 670 million years after the Big Bang, during the period of reionization, and it's 15 percent the size of the Milky Way. The galaxy was found to be larger than its other neighbors in that period when the universe was still very young. Its mass at the time the light was emitted is estimated to have been about 15% of the Milky Way's current mass. The galaxy was making new stars at roughly 80 times the rate of the current Milky Way, or equivalent to 800  worth of material turning to stars every year. The light reaching Earth was made by stars in EGS-zs8-1 that were 100 million to 300 million years old at the time they emitted the light. The age of EGS-zs8-1 places it in the reionization phase of creation, a time when hydrogen outside the galaxies was switching from a neutral to ionized state. According to the galaxy's discoverers, EGS-zs8-1 and other early galaxies were likely the causes of reionization.

Discovery
In 2013, Yale astronomer Pascal Oesch spotted an unexpected bright object while looking at Hubble Space Telescope images. He then confirmed the existence of the object using the Spitzer Space Telescope. Redshift calculations, using the Multi-Object Spectrometer for Infrared Exploration (MOSFIRE) equipment at the W.M. Keck Observatory in Hawaii, were then performed to precisely determine the age of the galaxy. Oesch and his colleagues at Yale and the University of California, Santa Cruz announced the find, which was named EGS-zs8-1, in May 2015 surpassing the previous record for oldest galaxy by about 30 million years.

See also

References

Boötes
Galaxies
?
Dwarf galaxies